In its succinct definition, Healthcare Engineering is "engineering involved in all aspects of healthcare”. The term “engineering” in this definition covers all engineering disciplines such as biomedical, chemical, civil, computer, electrical, environmental, hospital architecture, industrial, information, materials, mechanical, software, and systems engineering.

Based on the definition of healthcare, a more elaborated definition is: “Healthcare Engineering is engineering involved in all aspects of the prevention, diagnosis, treatment, and management of illness, as well as the preservation and improvement of physical and mental health and well-being, through the services offered to humans by the medical and allied health professions”.

Overview

Almost all engineering disciplines (e.g., Biomedical, Chemical, Civil, Computer, Electrical, Environmental, Industrial, Information, Materials, Mechanical, Software, and Systems Engineering) have made significant contributions and brought about advances in healthcare. Contributions have also been made by healthcare professionals (e.g., physicians, dentists, nurses, pharmacists, allied health professionals, and health scientists) who are engaged in supporting, improving, and/or advancing healthcare through engineering approaches. 

Healthcare Engineering is expected to play a role of growing importance as healthcare continues to be one of the world's largest and fastest-growing industries where engineering is a major factor of advancement through creating, developing, and implementing cutting-edge devices, systems, and procedures attributed to breakthroughs in electronics, information technology, miniaturization, material science, optics, and other fields, to address challenges associated with issues such as the continued rise in healthcare costs, the quality and safety of healthcare, care of the aging population, management of common diseases, the impact of high technology, increasing demands for regulatory compliance, risk management, and reducing litigation risk.  As the demand for engineers continues to increase in healthcare, Healthcare Engineering will be recognized as the most important profession where engineers make major contributions directly benefiting human health.

History

The American Society of Healthcare Engineering (ASHE), established in 1962, was one of the first to publicize the term “Healthcare Engineering”. ASHE, as well as its many local affiliate societies, is devoted to the health care physical environment, including design, building, maintenance, and operation of hospitals and other health care facilities, which represents only one sector of engineers’ activities in healthcare.  The term “healthcare engineers” first appeared in the scientific literature in 1989, where the critical role of engineers in the healthcare delivery system was discussed. A number of academic programs have adopted the name “Healthcare Engineering” (e.g., Indiana University, Northwestern University, Purdue University, Texas Tech University, University of Illinois, University of Michigan, University of North Carolina, University of Southern California, University of Toronto), although the description/definition of “Healthcare Engineering” by these programs varies, as each institution has designed its program based on its own distinctive interest, strength, and focus.  The first scholarly journal dedicated to Healthcare Engineering, Journal of Healthcare Engineering, was launched in 2010 by Dr. Ming-Chien Chyu, focusing on engineering involved in all aspects of healthcare delivery processes and systems.  In the meantime, a number of companies with various foci have adopted “Healthcare Engineering” in their names.

Healthcare Engineering was first defined in a white paper  published in 2015 by Dr. Chyu and 40 co-authors who are active members of and contributors to the Healthcare Engineering community all over the world. The white paper was reviewed by more than 280 reviewers, including members of US National Academy of Engineering, Engineering Deans of the world's top universities, administrators and faculty members of Healthcare Engineering academic programs, leaders of healthcare/medical and engineering professional societies/associations, leaders of healthcare industry and government, and Healthcare Engineering professionals from all over the world.  This white paper documents a clear, rigorous definition of Healthcare Engineering as an academic discipline, an area of research, a field of specialty, and a profession, and is expected to raise the status and visibility of Healthcare Engineering, help students choose Healthcare Engineering-related fields as majors, help engineers and healthcare professionals choose Healthcare Engineering as a profession, define Healthcare Engineering as a specialty area for the research community, funding agencies, and conference/event organizers, help job searching databases properly categorize Healthcare Engineering jobs, help healthcare employers recruit from the right pool of expertise, bring academic administrators’ attention to Healthcare Engineering in considering new program initiations, help governments and institutions of different levels put Healthcare Engineering into perspective for policy making, budgeting, and other purposes, and help publishers and librarians categorize literature related to Healthcare Engineering. Based on this white paper, a global, non-profit professional organization, Healthcare Engineering Alliance Society (HEALS), was founded by Dr. Chyu in 2015, that focuses on improving and advancing all aspects of healthcare through engineering approaches. This white paper has been cited in numerous scientific papers, such as.

Purpose

The purpose of Healthcare Engineering is to improve human health and well-being through engineering approaches.

Scope

Healthcare Engineering covers the following two major fields:
Engineering for Healthcare Intervention: Engineering involved in the development or provision of any treatment, preventive care, or test that a person could take or undergo to improve health or to help with a particular health problem.
Engineering for Healthcare Systems: Engineering involved in the complete network of organizations, agencies, facilities, information systems, management systems, financing mechanisms, logistics, and all trained personnel engaged in delivering healthcare within a geographical area.

The major subjects of Healthcare Engineering are listed the below table.  Updated ramifications and lists of topics within individual subjects are available from authoritative sources such as the leading societies/associations of individual subjects and government organizations.

Synergy

Healthcare Engineering features a synergy among the healthcare/medical sectors of all engineering disciplines and the engineering/technology sectors of the Health Sciences, as depicted in Figure 1.

Professional

Healthcare Engineering professionals are mainly (a) engineers from all engineering disciplines such as Biomedical, Chemical, Civil, Computer, Electrical, Environmental, Industrial, Information, Materials, Mechanical, Software, and Systems Engineering, and (b) healthcare professionals such as physicians, dentists, nurses, pharmacists, allied health professionals, and health scientists, who are engaged in supporting, improving, and/or advancing any aspect of healthcare through engineering approaches, in accordance with the above definition of Healthcare Engineering.  Since some healthcare professionals engaged in Healthcare Engineering may not be considered to be “engineers”, “Healthcare Engineering professional” is a more appropriate term than “Healthcare Engineer”.

Venue

Healthcare Engineering professionals generally perform their jobs in/with/for the healthcare industry. Major sectors and subsectors of healthcare industry along with Healthcare Engineering professionals’ contributions are summarized in Table 2.

Education & training

Engineers from almost all engineering disciplines (such as Biomedical, Chemical, Civil, Computer, Electrical, Environmental, Industrial, Information, Materials, Mechanical, Software, and Systems Engineering) are always in demand in healthcare. It is a common misconception that only engineers with a background in Biomedical Engineering, Clinical Engineering, or related areas may work in healthcare.  However, there is a need for courses and certificate type of programs that prepare non-biomedical engineering students and practicing engineers for service in healthcare.  On the other hand, healthcare professionals (physicians, dentists, nurses, pharmacists, allied health professionals, etc.) may benefit from training to apply engineering to their practice, problem solving, and advancing healthcare.  Due to the rapid advance of technology, continuing education plays a crucial role in ensuring Healthcare Engineering professionals’ continued competence.

References

Health care
Engineering disciplines
Health care occupations